Saint Patrick's School is a government-aided Lasallian Catholic boys' secondary school located along East Coast Road, Singapore. It is more commonly referred to as St Pat's, SPS or St Patrick's. Students and old boys call themselves Patricians or Sons of St. Patrick's.

History
Saint Patrick's was founded in 1933 as a temporary branch school of Saint Joseph's Institution, another Catholic boys' school in Singapore. It was built on land acquired by the La Salle Brothers in 1898 which was originally intended for building a resort bungalow. Brother Stephen Buckley saw the population growth in eastern Singapore and petitioned the La Salle Brothers to build a school on that piece of land. The main school building was completed in 1932 and Saint Patrick's became a school in its own right in 1933.

During World War II, the school was used by the British as a hospital and later by the Japanese as an administrative building. It was returned to the La Salle Brothers in 1946.

In 1957, the primary section of the school was separated and became Saint Stephen's School, a primary school for boys.

In 1969, Saint Patrick's became a co-educational school with the introduction of pre-university classes. However, with the phasing out of such classes in 1978, the school returned to being an all-boys school.

In 2002, Lucas Lak Pati Singh, a former vice principal of Changkat Changi Secondary School and an educator of 38 years, was posted into Saint Patrick's as the school's new principal.

Lucas Lak Pati Singh, the school's longest-serving principal, was succeeded in 2012 by Adolphus Tan, a former principal of Shuqun Secondary School. Joseph Peterson, a senior physics teacher, was promoted to vice-principal, joining Aloysius Yong, an alumnus who has served in various other capacities in the school and had been the sole vice-principal until then.

By 2019, Aloysius Yong had retired while Adolphus Tan and Joseph Peterson had been posted to other schools. The current school leadership consists of Mark Minjoot, the principal, and the new vice principal is Barnanas Tan.

Identity and culture 
In keeping with the school's Catholic traditions, students recite the Apostles' Creed in the morning, and the Angelus or the Regina Coeli during Easter at noon.

School symbols 

The shamrock is found on the student's belt, socks and neck-tie, on the running vests and on the T-shirts, and the school flag is a shamrock on a blue background. It is made up of three green hearts touching at the centre at an equal spacing from each other. Two of the hearts are at the lower half with one at the upper half. The shamrock represents the school's virtues of "Humanity, Humility & Honesty". The school's patron saint, Saint Patrick, used the shamrock to represent the Father, the Son and the Holy Spirit.

Uniform and discipline
The all-white school uniform is compulsory. The full uniform is a white short-sleeved shirt with the school badge pinned on the top left hand corner above the shirt pocket, white short trousers (for lower secondary students) or white long trousers (for upper secondary), white school socks with the shamrock logo, white canvas shoes or sports shoes (sports shoes do not have to be white), a tie and a belt.

Houses and sports events
The school has six houses named after former brother principals of the school.
 Brother Joseph McNally (McNally House) – green
 Brother Joseph Kiely (Kiely House) – blue
 Brother Stephen Buckley (Buckley House) – orange
 Brother Cannice Brennan (Brennan House) – yellow
 Brother Alban Rozario (Alban House) – red
 Brother Justinian De Souza (Justinian House) – purple

Houses compete in activities during Sports Day, Interhouse Games, Cross Country and other activities. Other than inter-house games, other sports events are also organised, such as the inter-class football league.

Affiliations
Saint Patrick's School is affiliated with all four of the Lasallian primary schools in Singapore, Saint Joseph's Institution as well as Catholic Junior College. It maintains relationships with other Roman Catholic schools in Singapore as well.

 Saint Joseph's Institution Junior (formerly Saint Michael's School)
 Saint Stephen's School
 De La Salle School
 Saint Anthony's Primary School

Co-curricular activities
Saint Patrick's has a military band, which has won gold medals in competitions locally and abroad, from 1984 to 2016. In the 2005 Singapore Youth Festival (SYF), the band won Gold with Honours. This was the first year such an award was introduced into the SYF grading scheme. In the 2007 SYF, the SPSMB achieved a Gold with Honours, which was the 2nd consecutive Gold With Honour award. In the 2009 SYF, the Band again won Gold with Honours, its tenth consecutive Gold award in the SYF and its third consecutive Gold with Honours. And in 2011 SYF, the Band achieved Gold with Honours, its 11th consecutive Gold award and fourth consecutive Gold with Honours. On special occasions, the school's Military Band plays a live version of the School Rally as opposed to the audio recording which is usually played every morning. The tradition took place particularly at the annual opening ceremony of the Patrician Annual Enrichment Festival (PAEF), but as of 2012, it has been gradually rescinded to a once-a-year affair. In addition, the Saint Patrick's School Military Band also held a commemorative concert at the Esplanade Concert Hall to celebrate its 60th Anniversary.

The school has four uniformed groups: the Scouts, National Cadet Corps (Land), National Cadet Corps (Air) and National Police Cadet Corps (NPCC).

The Saint Patrick's Pajigwad Scout Troop is the oldest scout troop in the Katong district. They have achieved the Frank Cooper Sands Gold award for several years running thanks to the high standard of training planned by the teachers and the Patrol Leaders Council. A notable alumni of the troop is Tony Tan, the seventh President of Singapore. He returned to the school during the Adiji Scout Ceremony in 2012 to accept his role as Chief Scout of the Singapore Scout Association.

The school also encourages students to take up leadership roles, hence the establishment of the Peer Leader's Council, the Prefectorial Board and the Board of Patrician Ambassadors. These Patrician student leaders facilitate camps such as the Patricians' Leadership Training Camp (PLTC) which is held overseas in countries such as Vietnam and Cambodia, as well as local camps such as the secondary one orientation camp for new students every year. Selected students also represent their school and participate in the Lasallian Leaders Servant Leadership Camp (LLSLC), where they and students from Lasallian schools in the Philippines interact with each other to learn servant leadership by helping less fortunate communities in the Philippines.

Alumni 

Politics
 Tony Tan, seventh President of Singapore
 George Yeo, former Cabinet Minister
 Patrick Tay, member of Parliament
 Chong Chieng Jen, Malaysian politician; Member of Parliament from Democratic Action Party (DAP)
 Yee Jenn Jong, former non-constituency Member of Parliament (NCMP)
Arts
 John Klass, radio DJ/Recording artiste
 Hayden Ng, fashion designer
 Glenn Ong, radio DJ
 Andrew Seow, actor and celebrity 
 Sheikh Haikel, actor and singer
 Alvin Tan, founder, The Necessary Stage
 Cyril Wong, poet

Sports
 Kelly Chan, former national sailor
 Steven Tan, former national footballer

Others
 Paddy Chew: AIDS activist

References

External links

 
 SPS Parent Support Group website

Lasallian schools in Singapore
Catholic schools in Singapore
Secondary schools in Singapore
Boys' schools in Singapore
Educational institutions established in 1933
Bedok
1933 establishments in Singapore